The 2017 Team Bath netball season saw Team Bath finish fourth overall in the 2017 Netball Superleague. Team Bath won seven games in a row to finish fourth in the regular season. Their qualification for the play-offs was only secured on the last day. In the semifinal they were beaten by Loughborough Lightning. They went on to finish fourth overall after defeat to Manchester Thunder in the 3rd/4th place play-off.

Squad

Preseason
Mike Greenwood Trophy
Team Bath reached the final of the Mike Greenwood Trophy but lost to Netball Superleague newcomers Wasps.

Tri-Tournament
On 7 January 2017 Team Bath hosted and won a three team tournament which also featured Loughborough Lightning and Wasps.

Regular season

Fixtures and results

Final table

Playoffs

Semi-final

3rd/4th place play-off

Team Bath end-of-season awards

References

2017 Netball Superleague season
2017